Fried Brains is the tenth studio album by punk rock band The Lurkers. The album was released on Vinyl, CD and as digital download. The first seven tracks of the album appeared on side A of the vinyl and the other 7 on side B in the same order as below, the vinyl had alternate album art work. The Album received positive reviews, Razorcake stated the album was not a return to the original sound but 'a mighty fine punk rock album circa 2008'.

Track listing 
"Come And Reminisce" - 2:07
"You're Gone" - 3:00
"Why Are You So Happy To Give Your Mind Away?" - 2:10
"Sick Transit" - 3:16
"Moved Away" - 3:09
"Why Were You That Way?" - 2:06
"Too Late To Change" - 3:09
"Time To Wake Up" - 2:50
"Go Forward" - 1:47
"Little Ole Wine Drinker Mills, Jennings" - 2:35
"Cheryl Bunkur" - 3:08
"Revenge Of The Dogs" - 4:22
"Punk Rock Brought Us Together" 3:21
"Fried Brains" - 4:27

Personnel
Arturo Bassick - Bass, Vocals
Nelly - Drums
Dave Kemp - Guitar, Backing Vocals

References

2008 albums
The Lurkers albums
Captain Oi! Records albums